St. Catharines Roma Wolves (also known as St. Catharines Wolves or simply Roma Wolves), are a Canadian soccer team, founded in 1967. The team currently plays in the semi-professional League1 Ontario in both the men's and women's divisions. The club is a former member of the Canadian Soccer League (CSL), where it fielded a professional team from 1998–2013, and now operates youth teams in the Peninsula Soccer League. Teams play out of Club Roma in St. Catharines, Ontario in the Niagara Peninsula. The team's colours are dark red and white, mimicking those of the famous Italian club A.S. Roma.

Formed in 1967 as Club Roma Soccer Association and competed in various local leagues. In 1977 the club renamed itself the St. Catharines Roma, and joined the National Soccer League. The club went through a golden era in the 1990s and early 2000s, winning several trophies in the National Soccer League, and the Canadian Professional Soccer League. After winning the CPSL Championship in 2001, the team went into a decline and briefly rebounded in 2007 with a division title. Shortly after St. Catharines went through another rebuilding period, but failed to see its fruits as the club ceased fielding a professional team in 2014 after the de-sanctioning of the CSL by the Canadian Soccer Association.

History

Formation and National Soccer League days (1978–92)
The club was formed in 1967, and went under the name of Club Roma Soccer Association and began operations in the Niagara Peninsula Soccer League. During their tenure in the Niagara League, the club achieved two regular season championships and two playoff championships. In 1972, the organization transferred to the Inter-City League where Roma quickly established itself as a powerhouse claiming a double in 1973, two consecutive playoff championships in 1974, and 1975. Their crowning achievement came in 1976 winning the Triple Crown – the league, cup and play-off championships.

The following year the club was granted a franchise in the National Soccer League (NSL), later renamed the CNSL with the addition of the Winnipeg Fury in 1993, and changed their name to St. Catharines Roma. The club's president Armand Di Fruscio would also serve as the president of the NSL from 1986–1995.  St. Catharines would experience their first taste of success in the NSL during the early 1990s.

The golden era and CPSL founding member (1993–01) 
The club's golden era began in 1993 winning the NSL championship, and finishing runners-up in 1994 along with an Umbro Cup. Prominent players during that time period were future Canadian internationals Tomasz Radzinski, Davide Xausa, Martin Dugas, and Paul Fenwick.

In the 1995 CNSL season Mark Kormet served as the head coach, and assembled a roster which would in later years play a dominant role within the CNSL, and its successor leagues. The roster consisted of Canadian international Lucio Ianiero, Dino Perri, Carlo Arghittu, Shayne Campbell, Paul Moore, Chris Handsor, and Gary McGuchan. The season marked the organization's first treble, winning the Umbro cup by defeating the Scarborough Astros on a penalty shootout. In the playoff finals the Wolves defeated the Toronto Jets, by a score of 2-1 with goals coming from Cameron Walker and Moore. At the conclusion of the season at the CNSL Awards banquet Kormet was named the CNSL Coach of the Year, while Chris Handsor received the MVP award.

Their success would continue through the following season as Dino Perri was given the dual role of coaching and playing for the team. The team roster was reinforced with the signings of Rick Titus, Peyvand Mossavat, Jerry Cipriani, Peter Sarantopoulos, and Peter Gastis. Perri managed to defend St. Cathraine's Umbro Cup by finishing first in the cup standings. In the regular season the Wolves finished second in the overall standings, and clinched a postseason berth, as well as posting the best defensive record throughout the season. Their opponents in the first round of the playoffs were the Toronto Supra, where St. Catharines advanced to the finals by winning the series on 2-1 on goals on aggregate. In the finals the Wolves faced the regular season champions Toronto Italia, but failed to capture the championship after losing by a score of 11–0 on goals on aggregate.

St. Catharines built on their 1996 season, and added reinforcements to the roster with the signings of Salvatore Borgh, and Gary Hughes. The Wolves continued their dynasty with another double victory for the club, going undefeated the entire league season and posting the best offensive record. In the first round of the postseason the Wolves faced Kosova Albanians, and advanced to the championship finals by winning the series 5–4 on goals on aggregate. St. Catharines faced Toronto Supra in the finals and claimed the championship by a score of 4–3 on goals on aggregate with goals coming from Cipriani, McGuchan, and Arghittu. In 1998, the CNSL merged with the stillborn Ontario Professional Soccer League and formed the Canadian Professional Soccer League. St. Catharines was a founding member along with three other CNSL clubs and four new expansion franchises.

In their debut season in the CPSL, St. Catharines would continue to flourish, and add prestige to its ranks. Where they secured a postseason berth by finishing second in the overall standings, and reached the finals of the Open Canada Cup tournament. In the finals they faced the league powerhouse Toronto Olympians, but lost to a score of 3–0. While in the postseason the Roma Wolves faced Glen Shields Sun Devils in the semi-finals which concluded in a 5-2 victory on goals on aggregate for the Wolves. The finals consisted of a revenge match between the Open Canada Cup finalists St. Catharines and Toronto – the match finished as a 2–2 draw which led to penalties where the Wolves denied the Olympians the chance of a treble by winning the game 4–2 in a penalty shootout, and reached a milestone by capturing the first CPSL Championship. The victory marked the sixth straight year that the club reached the league final and claimed their sixth league title in their 22-year-history. At the CPSL awards banquet Dino Perri received the CPSL Goalkeeper of the Year.

In 1999, St. Catharines experienced several bumps in the road throughout the season as losing their top striker Carlo Arghittu to the Toronto Lynx of the USL A-League. Lucio Ianiero took over the mantle of head coach, and failed to defend their championship title by failing to secure a postseason berth by finishing sixth in the overall standings. Though the team played poorly during the season they still managed to reach the semi-finals of the Open Canada Cup tournament where they faced the Olympians their rivals the previous season. The Wolves fell short in reaching the finals by losing the series to a score of 6–2 on goals on aggregate.

Roma Wolves recovered from their mediocre season with head coach Ianiero re-signing the core members of the team, by bringing back Arghittu, Hughes, and recruiting the services of Andrew McKay, and Danny Gallagher. St. Catharines began with a high note winning their first three matches, after losing a match to Toronto Olympians they bounced back with a seven-game undefeated streak. The team's momentum continued throughout the Open Canada Cup tournament where history repeated itself with St. Catharines reaching the finals, and facing their rivals the Toronto Olympians. Unfortunately the Wolves fell victim once more to Toronto losing by a score of 1–0. Overall the 2000 season was a success for the organization as they finished runners-up in the overall standings, and were tied with Toronto Olympians with the best defensive record. Their opponents in the postseason were Toronto Croatia, but were eliminated from the competition by losing the match by a score of 3-1. For his efforts Ianiero received the CPSL Coach of the Year award.

In 2001 the Wolves maintained their previous season roster with the addition of Simon Gatti, and Matt Albrecht. Throughout the season, St. Catharines experienced a roller coaster season by barely qualifying for the postseason as they managed to clinch the final playoff berth by three points. In the Open Canada Cup tournament they faced controversy in the semi-finals match against the Ottawa Wizards by using two ineligible players which resulted in their 1-0 victory to be reversed and given to Ottawa. Nonetheless Roma Wolves first opponents in the playoffs were the Montreal Dynamites, where St. Catharines came out victorious with a 2-1 victory with goals coming from Frank Zumpano, and McGutchan. In the next round they faced regular season champions Ottawa Wizards, and avenged their Open Canada Cup loss with McGutchan providing once more the goal which resulted in a 1–0 victory for the club, and a trip to the CPSL Championship finals match. The finals consisted of St. Catharines facing Toronto Supra, a repeat of the 1997 CNSL Championship match. After a scoreless 90' min match the game went into overtime with John Sozio scoring the winning goal at 116' min, and thus claiming the Wolves second CPSL Championship title. Danny Gallagher, along with Garrett Caldwell were voted the CPSL Cup finals MVP.

Rebuilding period (2002–06)

The 2002 season brought significant changes within the structure as the club went through a rebuilding stage. St. Catharines transferred five core veterans to expansion franchise Hamilton Thunder, while others retired. One notable addition to the changes were the hiring of former Roma Wolves head coach Jimmy Douglas as the General Manager  For the majority of the season the club was plagued with injuries, suspensions, and a poor team chemistry which resulted in a struggle to clinch the final playoff berth, and ended in a failure by falling short by four points. The Wolves didn't feature better in the Open Canada Cup where they were eliminated in the first round of the tournament by Hamilton. The season marked an end to the club's golden era which began in the final years of the CNSL, and concluded in the infant stages of the CPSL. The Wolves would go through a rebuilding period that would drag out for about five seasons.

During their rebuilding period Ianiero retired in 2004 after failing to qualify for the playoffs in two straight seasons, but managed a respectable run in the 2003 Open Canada Cup tournament by reaching the semi-finals before losing out to the Metro Lions by a score of 2–1. Another notable achievement was accomplished by prolific striker Carlo Arghittu by finishing as the league's top scorer in 2003. Tom Bernardi a former Roma Wolves player was chosen as Ianiero successor for the 2005 season. After a bold attempt to secure a playoff berth he fell short by two points. In 2006, Miro Marjanovic was brought in to coach the Wolves, but also fell short in securing the final postseason berth by three points.

Return to prominence and departure (2007–14) 
After five straight seasons of failing to secure a postseason berth, St. Catharines appointed the services of James McGillivray as head coach. McGillivray was instrumental in improving the performance of St. Catharines during the 2007 season. The Wolves returned to prosperity by achieving a nine-game undefeated streak, and clinching the National Division title their first piece of silverware since 2001. Their opponents in the quarterfinals of the playoffs were the Canadian Lions, and advanced to the next round by winning the match 10–9 in a penalty shootout. St. Catharines faced Toronto Croatia in the semi-finals, but fell short by a score of 3–2. McGillivary, and Claudio Perri were rewarded with the CSL Coach of the Year, and CSL Goalkeeper of the Year awards for their contributions. McGillivary tenure with St. Catharines would last for another two seasons, where in both seasons he led them to the playoffs, and each season was eliminated in the preliminary round of the playoffs. In 2009, long time general manager and team builder Armand Di Fruscio was awarded the Harry Paul Gauss Award by the league.

In 2011, McGillivary signed with expansion rivals Niagara United, and his replacement was Carlo Arghittu. The Wolves went through another period of rebuilding under Arghittu, failing to qualify for the postseason during his three-year tenure. In 2012–13, following the controversy faced by the CSL over the Canadian Soccer Association decision to adopt the recommendations from the Rethink Management Report the CSA de-sanctioned the league putting the future of many of its clubs and operations in doubt. In May 2014 the Roma Wolves ceased operations of the professional team due to the de-sanctioning of the CSL, including financial, volunteer issues and combined with competition from Niagara United for players in the Niagara Peninsula.

St. Catharines Club Roma Soccer still operates as a soccer club providing a place to play for children, both boys and girls ages 3 to 19, and women in house leagues, local travel leagues (Niagara Soccer League and the Hamilton MJ Soccer League).  There are still competitive men's teams in the Peninsula Soccer League.

Return to semi-pro
In 2021, the team was re-launched, joining League1 Ontario. In 2022, they added a female team in the League1 Ontario women's division.

Year-by-year

Men

Women

Notable players

 Canada
 Carlo Arghittu 
 Salvatore Borgh 
 Shayne Campbell 
 Jimmy Douglas 
 Martin Dugas 
 Paul Fenwick 
 Simon Gatti 
 Chris Handsor 
 Lucio Ianiero 
 Paul Moore 
 Peyvand Mossavat 
 Tomasz Radzinski 
 Peter Sarantopoulos 
 Josh Wagenaar 
 Cameron Walker 
 Davide Xausa 

 United States
 Andrew McKay 
 Kofi Opare 
 Randy Pikuzinski 
 Rudy Pikuzinski 

 Trinidad and Tobago
 Anton Skerritt 
 Rick Titus

Head coaches

Honours
CNSL Championship (3): 1993, 1995, 1997 
Canadian National Soccer League Regular Season Champions (1): 1997
NSL Cup (1): 1990
CNSL Umbro Cup (3): 1994, 1995, 1996
CPSL Championship (2): 1998, 2001 
Canadian Soccer League National Division (1): 2007
NSL Second Division Champions (1): 1978             
Inter-City Soccer League - Hiram Walker Cup (4): 1973, 1974, 1975, 1976
Inter-City Soccer League - McGuiness Trophy (2): 1973, 1976

References

External links
 

Canadian National Soccer League teams
Soccer clubs in Ontario
Canadian Soccer League (1998–present) teams
Sport in St. Catharines
Association football clubs established in 1967
1967 establishments in Ontario
League1 Ontario teams